Agniolamia is a genus of longhorn beetles of the subfamily Lamiinae, containing the following species:

 Agniolamia albovittata Breuning, 1977
 Agniolamia pardalis (Jordan, 1903)

References

Lamiini